Molinelli is an Italian surname. Notable people with the surname include:

Andrea Molinelli (born 1993), Italian footballer
Roberto Molinelli (born 1963), Italian composer, conductor, and violist

Italian-language surnames
Surnames of Italian origin